Diéfoula Forest is a protected forest in Burkina Faso. 
It is located in Comoé Province.

The dominant tree species are Daniellia olivieri, Isoberlinia doka, Pterocarpus erinaceus and Khaya senegalensis.

The average annual rainfall is about 1,300 mm.

References

Protected areas of Burkina Faso
Comoé Province